Tuc-el-nuit Lake is a lake in the Similkameen Division Yale Land District within the Southern Interior of British Columbia, Canada.

Geographical context 
The lake is a spring fed lake east of the Okanagan River between Osoyoos and Vaseux Lakes, located in the town of Oliver.

References

Lakes of British Columbia
Lakes of the Okanagan
Similkameen Division Yale Land District